The 2001 French Open was the second Grand Slam event of 2001 and the 100th edition of the French Open. It took place at the Stade Roland Garros in Paris, France, from late May through early June, 2001.

Seeds
Champion seeds are indicated in bold text while text in italics indicates the round in which those seeds were eliminated.

 Rennae Stubbs /  Todd Woodbridge (quarterfinals)
 Cara Black /  Sandon Stolle (first round)
 Ai Sugiyama /  Ellis Ferreira (first round)
 Arantxa Sánchez Vicario /  Jared Palmer (second round)
 Kimberly Po-Messerli /  Donald Johnson (first round)
 Nicole Arendt /  Mark Knowles (second round)
 Barbara Schett /  Joshua Eagle (first round)
 Nathalie Tauziat /  David Adams (first round)

Draw

Finals

Top half

Bottom half

External links
 Draw
2001 French Open – Doubles draws and results at the International Tennis Federation

Mixed Doubles
French Open by year – Mixed doubles